The term .32 rimfire refers to a family of cartridges which were chambered in revolvers and rifles in the late 19th and early 20th centuries. These rounds were made primarily in short and long lengths, but extra short, long rifle and extra long lengths were offered.

Manufacturers
Manufacturers in the USA generally discontinued making .32 rimfire ammunition after the country's entrance into World War II in 1941. It was available from old stocks for some years afterwards, but it has been made only sporadically in the last 70 years. Occasionally, special limited runs of .32 rimfire ammunition are manufactured for gun collectors with shootable specimens, but the round is not considered a current commercial cartridge. Navy Arms Company had periodically imported .32 Rimfire Long made by CBC in Brazil until 2014.

History
The .32 short was designed in 1860 by Smith & Wesson for their Model 2 revolver. In 1868, they introduced the .32 Long in the Model 1 Second Issue revolver.

The .32 Long fired a slightly heavier  bullet at approximately the same velocity, for  muzzle energy. Remington rifles in .32 rimfire listed a bore diameter of 

The .32 Short and Long rimfire cartridges matched the external dimensions of the .32 Colt Short and Long centerfire cartridges; the Marlin Model 1892 lever-action repeating rifle was shipped with two firing pins, one rimfire and one centerfire, to allow use of either the rimfire or centerfire cartridges. Revolvers and single shot rifles chambered for one of the longer .32 rimfire cartridges would chamber and fire the shorter cartridges.

Remington Arms manufactured .32 Extra Short ammunition (also known as .32 Protector) until 1920 for use in the Protector Palm Pistol and Remington Magazine Pistol.

During its lifetime, the .32 rimfire was loaded with black powder, followed by semi-smokeless and smokeless powder loadings. While it was popular as a very effective small game caliber, it was considered obsolete by the late 1930s, in part due to the introduction of high-velocity versions of the .22 Long Rifle using smokeless powder.

References

See also
 Hopkins & Allen
 American Civil War
 Table of handgun and rifle cartridges

Pistol and rifle cartridges
Rimfire cartridges
Cartridge families